Arne Vidar Røed (23 July 1946 – 24 April 1976), known in medical literature by the anagram Arvid Darre Noe, was a Norwegian sailor and truck driver who contracted one of the earliest confirmed cases of HIV/AIDS. His was the first confirmed HIV case in Europe though the disease was not identified at the time of his death. 

The virus spread to his wife and youngest daughter both of whom also died; this was the first documented cluster of AIDS cases before the AIDS epidemic of the early 1980s. 

The researchers studying the cases referred to Røed as the "Norwegian sailor" or the anagram "Arvid Darre Noe" to conceal his identity; his true name, Arne Vidar Røed, became known long after his death.

Illness and death
Roed began his career in the merchant navy in 1961, at the age of 15. As established by the journalist Edward Hooper, Roed visited Africa twice during his travels; the first time from 1961 to 1962 on board the Hoegh Aronde, along the west coast of Africa to Douala, Cameroon. On this trip, Roed contracted gonorrhea. 

By 1968, Røed was no longer a sailor and was working as a long haul truck driver throughout Europe mainly in West Germany.

Beginning in 1968, Røed suffered from joint pain, lymphedema, and lung infections. (This was also the year American teenager Robert Rayford first presented with similar symptoms; he was later identified as the first North American AIDS case). 

Røed's condition stabilized with treatment until 1975, when his symptoms worsened. He developed motor control difficulties and dementia and died on 24 April 1976. 

His wife grew ill with similar symptoms and died in December. Although their two older children were not born infected, their third child, a daughter, died on 4 January 1976, at the age of eight, and was the first person documented to have died of AIDS outside the United States. 

Røed, his wife, and his daughter were buried in Borre, Vestfold, Norway.

Later investigations
Approximately a decade after Røed's death, tests by Dr Stig Sophus Frøland of the Oslo National Hospital concluded that blood samples from Røed, his daughter and wife all tested positive for HIV.

Based on research conducted after his death, Røed is believed to have contracted HIV in Cameroon in 1961 or 1962, where he was known to have been sexually active with many African women, including sex workers. Røed was infected with HIV-1 group O, which is known to have been prevalent in Cameroon in the early 1960s.

See also
 Gaëtan Dugas — gay Canadian flight attendant who was alleged to have infected between 245 and 350 gay men from 1972 until his death in 1984, and was once called "Patient Zero" by author Randy Shilts; this claim was later refuted
 Grethe Rask — Danish physician infected in 1964 in Congo-Léopoldville (now DR Congo) or in 1972 while performing surgery; died in 1977
 Robert Rayford — American teenager from St. Louis, Missouri who was the first confirmed death from AIDS in North America; died in 1969 at the age of 16
 Timeline of early HIV/AIDS cases

References

1946 births
1976 deaths
AIDS-related deaths in Norway
Burials in Norway
Norwegian sailors
People from Horten
Truck drivers